Mathcounts, stylized as MATHCOUNTS, is a nationwide middle school mathematics competition held in various places in the United States. Its current lead sponsors are Raytheon Technologies and the U.S. Department of Defense STEM.

Topics covered in the math contest include geometry, counting, probability, number theory, and algebra.

History 
Mathcounts was started in 1983 by the National Society of Professional Engineers, the National Council of Teachers of Mathematics, and CNA Insurance to increase middle school interest in mathematics. The first national-level competition was held in 1984. The competition spread quickly in middle schools, and today it is the best-known middle school mathematics competition. In 2007 Mathcounts launched the National Math Club Program and in 2011 Mathcounts launched the Math Video Challenge Program.

2020 was the first year since 1984 where a national competition was not held, due to the COVID-19 pandemic. The "MATHCOUNTS Week" event featuring problems from the 2020 State Competition was held on the Art of Problem Solving website as a replacement.

Competition levels 

The competition is divided into four levels: school, chapter, state, and national. Students progress to each level in the competition based on performance at the previous level. As the levels progress, the problems get harder.

All students are either school-based competitors ("SBC's") or non-school competitors ("NSC's"). All students whose school is participating in the competition series are SBC's and start at the school level. Students whose school is not participating in the competition series are NSC's and start at the chapter level, competing individually.

School level 
Coaches of each school select up to 12 students from their school to advance to the chapter competition, with 4 of them competing on the official school team. The rest compete individually.

Chapter level 
All qualifying students compete individually. Students on an official school team also compete as a team. The countdown round is optional and can either be used to determine top individuals or as an unofficial round. The top teams and individuals advance to the state competition. The exact number of qualifiers varies by region.

State level 
All qualifying students compete individually. Students on a qualifying school team also compete as a team. The countdown round is optional and can either be used to determine top individuals or as an unofficial round. The top 4 individuals qualify for the national competition. The coach of the winning school team is the coach for the state team. Some states have universities within the state that give scholarships to the top individuals of the state.

National level 

Qualifying students and coaches receive an all-expense paid trip to the national competition. The competition typically lasts 3–4 days on Mother's Day weekend. The coach of the state team is the supervisor for the team. The students compete individually for the title of national champion. They also compete as a team to represent their state.

The 12 highest scoring individuals advance to the countdown round. The winner of this round is declared the national champion.

Scholarships and prizes are awarded to the top individuals and top state teams. These winners can sometimes win a trip to Space Camp or to the White House to meet the current President of the United States.

Other programs 
In addition to the competition program, students can also participate in the Math Video Challenge program and the National Math Club program. These programs are open to the same students as the competition program.

Math Video Challenge program 
The Math Video Challenge program allows students in teams of 4 to create a video that explains the solution to a problem from the Mathcounts School Handbook in a real-world scenario. Judges review and score each video based on mathematical content, communication, creativity and real-world scenario. From the submitted videos, they select 50-100 Quarterfinalist videos. From these, they then select 12 Semifinalist videos and 6 Judges' Choice Winners. Then they select 4 Finalist videos. Finalist teams receive an all-expense paid trip to the national competition where they present their video at the Math Video Challenge Finals. The 224 students that qualified for the national competition then vote to determine the winning video. The 4 winning students receive trophies and scholarships.

National Math Club program 
The National Math Club program allows schools to register a math club for free. Upon registering, club leaders earn free online access to dozens of games, explorations, and problem sets. Clubs that meet at least 5 times during the year achieve silver level status, and clubs that create a creative and collaborative project can achieve gold level status. Clubs that achieve silver and gold level status can earn prizes and recognition. Each year, clubs that achieve gold level status are put into a Grand Prize drawing. The club leader and 4 students from the Grand Prize winning club receive an all-expense paid trip to attend the national competition as honored guests.

Alumni Scholarships  
Each year, Mathcounts awards two types of scholarships to alumni who participated in at least one of the Mathcounts programs during middle school: the Mathcounts Alumni Scholarship to alumni whose experience in Mathcounts was extremely influential and the Community Coaching Scholarship to alumni who start Mathcounts competition series programs at underrepresented schools. Multiple people can win the same scholarship in the same year.

Competition winners 

Below is a table documenting each year's winning individual, winning state team and coach, and the location of the national competition.

See also 
 American Mathematics Competitions
 List of mathematics competitions

References

External links 
 Mathcounts Home Page
 White House Photos: 2001, 2005, 2006, 2007, 2008, 2009, 2010

Mathematics competitions
Recurring events established in 1984
1984 establishments in the United States